The 1994 Five Nations Championship was the 65th series of the Five Nations Championship, an annual rugby union competition between the major Northern Hemisphere rugby union national teams. The tournament consisted of ten matches held between 15 January and 19 March 1994.

The tournament was the 65th in its then format as the Five Nations. Including the competition's former incarnation as the Home Nations Championship, the 1994 Five Nations Championship was the 100th Northern Hemisphere rugby union championship.

The championship was contested by England, France, Ireland, Scotland and Wales. It was the first time that the Five Nations championship title was decided by using points difference to separate the top two teams that finished level on win–loss record. Wales won the tournament, although a 15–8 away defeat by England in their final match meant they failed to win the Grand Slam:  England had needed a 16-point margin of victory over Wales in the final match to snatch the tournament themselves, but fell short, conceding a late Welsh try while pressing for the score that would have given them a big enough margin. Earlier in the tournament, England won the Calcutta Cup beating Scotland at Murrayfield. In a comparatively low scoring tournament, England then surprisingly lost at home to Ireland, ending their own hopes of a Grand Slam. Scotland performed poorly throughout and although somewhat unfortunate to lose to England, were heavily defeated by Wales in their opening match and could only manage a draw against Ireland, before being beaten by France at home in their final fixture. The overall result was, however, Wales' 22nd outright victory, including seven victories in the Home Nations, excluding eleven titles shared with other countries. England and France placed second and third with three and two wins respectively. Ireland placed fourth, with Scotland, last. None of the Home Nations achieved the Triple Crown.

Participants
The teams involved were:

Squads

Table

Results

External links
1994 Five Nations Championship at ESPN

Five Nations
Six Nations Championship seasons
Five Nations
Five Nations
Five Nations
Five Nations
Five Nations
  
Five Nations
Five Nations
Five Nations